Nasser Alizadeh is an Iranian Greco-Roman wrestler.

Alizadeh won 2 Gold medals in the 87 kg event at Asian Championships in 2021 and 2022.

Alizadeh placed fifth at 2022 World Wrestling Championships in category 87 kg.

References

External links 
 

1998 births
Living people
People from Chamestan
Iranian male sport wrestlers
Asian Wrestling Championships medalists
Sportspeople from Mazandaran province
21st-century Iranian people